VIT may refer to:

 Vitoria Airport (IATA code VIT; ICAO airport code LEVT), Vitoria-Gasteiz, Basque Country, Spain
 VIT University (disambiguation)
 Victorian Institute of Teaching
 Vellore Institute of Technology
 Vidyalankar Institute of Technology
 Vishwakarma Institute of Technology
 Viti language (ISO 639 code vit)
 Vertical Interval Timecode, video scanline timecode
 VIT signals (vertical interval test signal) in broadcast television
 VIT, C.A. (Venezolana de Industria Tecnológica, Compañía Anónima), a computer hardware manufacturer in Venezuela
 Vitalicio Seguros (UCI code VIT) pro-cycling team
 Polikarpov VIT, a series of Soviet ground-attack planes
 Polikarpov VIT-1, Soviet ground-attack plane
 Polikarpov VIT-2, Soviet ground-attack plane
 Vision transformer (ViT), a machine learning model
 Vaccine Injury Table, a component of the U.S. National Vaccine Injury Compensation Program

See also

 Vit (disambiguation)